Malecela is a Tanzanian surname. Notable people with the surname include:

Anne Malecela (born 1956), Tanzanian politician, wife of John
John Malecela (born 1934), Prime Minister of Tanzania 
Mwele Ntuli Malecela (born 1963), Tanzanian politician and administrator

Surnames of African origin